The 1992 Southern Conference baseball tournament was held at College Park in Charleston, South Carolina, from April 23 through 27. Top seeded  won the tournament and earned the Southern Conference's automatic bid to the 1992 NCAA Division I baseball tournament. It was the Catamounts sixth tournament win.

The tournament used a double-elimination format.

Seeding 
The league's teams were seeded one through eight based on regular season conference winning percentage only. There were no ties in the standings, so no tiebreakers were necessary.

Bracket 

* - Indicates game required extra innings

All-Tournament Team

References 

Tournament
Southern Conference Baseball Tournament
Southern Conference baseball tournament
Southern Conference baseball tournament